Lambertiodes harmonia is a moth of the family Tortricidae. It is found in China (Sichuan, Yunnan, Tibet), Burma, Thailand, India, Nepal and Vietnam.

References

Moths described in 1908
Sparganothini